Ottar Dahl (5 January 1924 – 4 April 2011) was a Norwegian historian and historiographer.

Dahl was born in Nannestad. He took the dr. philos. degree in 1957, worked at the University of Oslo as a scholarship holder from 1957, docent from 1960 and professor from 1966 to 1991. He then retired to a position as professor emeritus.

Dahl was a member of the Norwegian Academy of Science and Letters. From 1972 to 1975 he chaired the Norwegian Historical Association. He died in April 2011.

Selected bibliography
Historisk materialisme. Historiesynet hos Koht og Bull, 1952
Om årsaksproblemer i historisk forskning, 1957
Norsk historieforskning i det 19. og 20. århundre, 1959
Grunntrekk i historieforskningens metodelære, 1967
Problemer i historiens teori, 1986
Fra konsens til katastrofe - kapitler av fascismens historie i Italia, 1996

References

1924 births
2011 deaths
People from Nannestad
20th-century Norwegian historians
Academic staff of the University of Oslo
Members of the Norwegian Academy of Science and Letters